The individual dressage event, part of the equestrian program at the 2000 Summer Olympics, was held from 26 to 30 September 2000 at the Sydney International Equestrian Centre 45 miles outside of Sydney, Australia.  Like all other equestrian events, the dressage competition was mixed gender, with both male and female athletes competing in the same division. Forty-eight horse and rider pairs were entered.

Medalists

Results

Grand Prix Test
Held Tuesday, 26 September. 
The first round was the Grand Prix Test.  Each of the 48 pairs went through a series of movements in the sandy arena, with judges in five different positions observing the movements and giving percentage scores based on the execution of the movements.  The total score for the round was the average of the five judges' scores.  The top 25 pairs advanced to the second round, though no more than 3 pairs from any nation could advance.*

Grand Prix Special 2nd Qualifier
Held Friday, 29 September. 
The second round was the Grand Prix Special 2nd Qualifier. It was similar to the first, though the time allotted was shorter.  The score from this round was averaged with the score from the Grand Prix Test. The top 17 pairs advanced to the final, though no more than 3 pairs from any nation could advance.

Grand Prix Freestyle
Held Saturday, 30 September. The final round of dressage competition was the Grand Prix Freestyle Test.  Fifteen pairs competed in this round, in which they designed their own program of movements set to music.  They were judged on both execution of the movements (technical) and how well their performance matched the music (artistic).  Each of the five judges gave a score from 0 to 10 in both categories, with the final score for the round being the sum of those ten scores.  This score was then added to the scores from the other two rounds to determine final ranking.

References

Sources
 Official Report of the 2000 Sydney Summer Olympics available at  https://web.archive.org/web/20060622162855/http://www.la84foundation.org/5va/reports_frmst.htm

Equestrian at the 2000 Summer Olympics